Drugera morona is a moth of the family Notodontidae first described by Herbert Druce in 1898. It is found in Central America.

The larvae been reared in on various Miconia species.

References

Moths described in 1898
Notodontidae